Tallyho is an unincorporated community in Wood County, West Virginia, United States.

References 

Unincorporated communities in West Virginia